Kallakadal/Swell surge are flash flood events that take place without any noticeable advance change in local winds or any other apparent signature in the coastal environment. It is derived from a Malayalam word literally meaning 'sea-thief'. Kallakkadal event is considered as one of the major societal problems along the Indian coasts and these are caused by high swell waves, without any sign in the local winds, sometimes cause severe flooding.

Description

A recent research focused on the causes of Kallakkadal/swell surge has established the link between North Indian Ocean high swell events and the meteorological conditions in the Southern Ocean using a combination of ocean wave observations and numerical model simulations. The study confirms that Kallakkadal events are caused by swells propagating from the Southern Indian Ocean of 30°S, from the region between Africa and Australia. Swell waves are generated by distant weather systems, where wind blows for a duration of time over a large fetch.

The long period swell waves (>18 s) seen during Kallakkadal/Swell surge events are generated in the southern Indian Ocean by severe low pressure system existed 3–5 days prior to the Kallakkadal events. The quasi-stationary nature of the southern ocean low pressure systems provides strong (~25 ms-1) and long duration (~3 days) surface winds over a large fetch; essential conditions for the generation of long period swells. The intense winds associated with these severe low pressure systems in the Southern Indian Ocean trigger the generation of high waves which propagate to Indian Coastal regions as swells. Furthermore, these swells affect coastal areas which are dependent on the local topography, angle of incidence and tidal conditions, cause high wave activity and Kallakkadal along the Indian coastal regions. The study shows that Kallakkadal events along NIO coasts can be effectively monitored and forecasted at least 2 days in advance if the meteorological conditions of the Southern Ocean are properly monitored. INCOIS has been now successfully giving advanced warning to the coastal community about the Kallakkadal events.

Characteristics of kallakadal
Characteristics of “Kallakkadal” as follows:
This phenomenon occurs mostly during pre-monsoon season and sometimes during post monsoon.
It continues for a few days.
It inundates the low lying coasts.
During high tide the run-up, water level can reach as much as 3–4 m above Maximum Water Level (MWL).

See also
coastal flooding
Tsunami
Saltwater intrusion
Coastal Management

References
 

Weather hazards